Mark Knowles and Daniel Nestor were the defending champions, but lost in second round to qualifiers Alberto Berasategui and Alberto Martín.

Luis Lobo and Javier Sánchez won the title by defeating Neil Broad and Piet Norval 6–3, 7–6 in the final.

Seeds
The top four seeds received a bye into the second round.

Draw

Finals

Top half

Bottom half

References
 Official results archive (ATP)
 Official results archive (ITF)

Doubles